Talisia esculenta is a medium-sized tree native to the Amazon Basin, and is found in Brazil, Colombia, Peru, Paraguay and Bolivia.

The tree and fruit are called pitomba in English, Portuguese and Spanish, olho-de-boi, pitomba-rana and pitomba-de-macaco in Portuguese, pitoulier comestible in French and cotopalo in Spanish and karajá bola in Guarani. Pitomba is also used as the name for Eugenia luschnathiana.

Description
Talisia esculenta can grow to a height of 9–20 m, with a trunk up to 45 cm diameter. The leaves are arranged alternately, pinnately compound, with 5–11 leaflets, the leaflets 5–12 cm long and 2–5 cm broad.

The flowers are produced in a panicle 10–15 cm long, the individual flowers small and white.   The fruit is round to ellipsoid in shape, 1.5–4 cm in diameter. Beneath the outer peel is the white, translucent, sweet-sour pulp with one or two large, elongated seeds.

Uses
The fruit is eaten fresh and used to make juice. The sap is used as a fish poison. Roasted seeds are used to treat diarrhea.

References 
International Plant Genetic Resources Institute: Talisia esculenta
Talisia esculenta
Arvores e Arbustos do Brasil: Talisia esculenta (in Portuguese)
Field Museum: herbarium specimen (photo)

esculenta
Tropical fruit
Flora of the Amazon
Flora of Brazil
Flora of Colombia
Flora of Peru
Flora of Paraguay
Flora of Bolivia